Pori is a city and municipality on the west coast of Finland. Pori was established in 1558 by Duke John, who later became King John III of Sweden.

The municipality is unilingually Finnish. It is the  largest city in Finland, and the 7th largest urban area. Pori is also the capital of the Satakunta region (pop. 224,028) and the Pori sub-region (pop. 136,905). Pori was also once one of the main cities with Turku in the former Turku and Pori Province (1634–1997). The neighboring municipalities are Eurajoki, Kankaanpää, Kokemäki, Merikarvia, Nakkila, Pomarkku, Sastamala, Siikainen and Ulvila.

Pori is especially known nationwide for its Jazz Festival, Yyteri's sandy beaches, Kirjurinluoto, Porin Ässät ice hockey club, FC Jazz football club, which won two championships in the Veikkausliiga in the 1990s, and Pori Theater, which is the first Finnish-language theater in Finnish history. Pori is also known for its local street food called porilainen. During its history, the city of Pori has burned down nine times; only Oulu has burned more often, as many as ten times. The current coat of arms of Pori was confirmed for use by President P. E. Svinhufvud on December 11, 1931, and was later redrawn by Olof Eriksson. The city council reaffirmed the use of the redrawn version on October 27, 1959. The bear motif of the coat of arms comes from a 17th century seal and the motto, deus protector noster or "God is our protector", is also on the coat of arms of the city's founder, Duke John.

Name
The name Pori comes from the -borg part (meaning citadel, fortress or castle) of the original name in Swedish with a Fennicised pronunciation. The whole Swedish name Björneborg literally means Bear Fortress or Bear Castle, and the Latin-Greek Arctopolis means Bear City.

History

Early years 
City of Pori was established on March 8, 1558 by Duke John of Finland who was later known as John III of Sweden. It was a successor to the medieval towns of Teljä (Kokemäki) and Ulvila. Sailing the Kokemäki river had become more and more difficult since the 14th century due to the post-glacial rebound. The importance of Kokemäki and Ulvila began to decline as the ships could no longer navigate the river. In the 16th century the situation had become so bad that Duke John decided to establish a new harbour and market town closer to the sea.

The Bourgeoisie of Ulvila were ordered to migrate to the newly founded city and on 8 March 1558 John III gave the charter of Pori, which read: "Because we have seen that it would be best to build a strong market town alongside the sea, and because we cannot find anywhere suitable for fortifying in Ulvila, we have chosen another location at Pori."

At the beginning Pori had around 300 involuntary residents. However, they soon recognized the advantages of their new location, which offered opportunities for profitable trading, among other things. Ship building has been important since the beginning of history of Pori. Shipyard started by the river in 1572 and it worked until the early 20th century. The biggest ship probably ever built in Pori was "Porin Kraveli," completed in 1583.

Greater Wrath and Crimean War 

During the Greater Wrath of 1713, Pori was occupied by Russian troops. Eight Russian regiments spent four months in town from September 1713 to January 1714 vandalizing and demolishing the city. Some of the wealthiest residents vanished, they were probably imprisoned and taken to Russia. Wind mills and storage houses were burnt. Most of the oxen and horses and more than 400 boats were lost. The Russian invasion of Finland continued another seven years. It meant great financial loss for Pori as the foreign trade was completely finished. After the Greater Wrath, Pori lost its staple rights and the city went into deep depression. A new "golden age" for Pori started in 1765 as the city got back the staple rights for foreign trade.

As the Crimean War broke out in 1853, Pori was attacked by both the French Navy and British Navy in 1855 during the Åland War. The French frigate D'Assos made the first attempt on July and managed to catch one ship outside the Isokari island before they sailed further north. Another attack was made by the British fleet on 9 August. Mayor Klaus Wahlberg negotiated a deal with the enemy and the city was saved. Two sailing ships and 17 smaller boats along with some other properties were given to the British. The activities of the people of Pori were considered shameful and according to some information, Lieutenant General Alexander von Wendt would have later demoted the officer who had retreated from Luotsinmäki to sergeant during a review held at the Pori market square.

City fires 
As most of its houses were made of wood, Pori has had its share of fires. The town has burned down and been rebuilt nine times. The city was first destroyed by fire in 1571 and the last major fire was in 1852. More than 75 per cent of the city was destroyed in 1852 and most of the residents became homeless. Only a few buildings, such as the Town Hall, were saved. The Great Fire of 1852 was one of the worst disasters in Finland so far. The new city plan and the shape of the present old town was designed by Swedish architect C. T. von Chiewitz. The newly completed buildings, such as the Pori Theatre and Hotel Otava are historically and culturally important. Four esplanades, which are wider than the other streets, divided the new city center in four parts.

Finnish Civil War and World War II 
During the 1918 Finnish Civil War, Pori was a part of the Finnish Socialist Workers' Republic. The city was not on the direct war zone but some terror was made by both sides. The best known incident was the execution of 11 Whites at the schoolyard of Pori Lyceum.

During World War II, Pori was bombed four times by the Soviet Airforce in 1939–1940. The worst bombing occurred on 2 February 1940 as 21 people were killed. Most of the bombs were aimed to the harbour area instead of the city itself. From 1942 to 1944 Pori Airport served as an air depot for the Jagdgeschwader 5 of German Luftwaffe. Pori air depot was known as "Feldluftpark Pori" and it was one of the major German air depots in Northern Europe. In September 1944, Germans left the airport and destroyed many of their facilities with explosives. One German-built hangar is still used today. Total of 319 Soviet Red Army prisoners of war died in Pori as they were used as a forced labor by the Germans. Soviet soldiers are buried at Vähärauma district in the western part of the city.

Geography

River and delta 
The geological uplift after the last ice age has been relatively high at the mouth of the Kokemäenjoki river. When the city was established in 1558, it was situated on the shore of Pori bay. Because of this uplift the delta of the river now begins in front of the city. The recreation area of Kirjurinluoto is actually on an island connected with bridges to the mainland. Pori National Urban Park preserves the story of the phases of development of the town born at the mouth of the river Kokemäenjoki.

Climate 
Pori has a humid continental climate (Dfb), with moderation from the Gulf of Bothnia helping to keep September above the 10 °C (50 °F) isotherm, and is amongst the northern extent of that climate in Finland. Winters are long, and cold, but are notably shorter and warmer than in the Northern parts of Finland due to the marine effect and location by the Bothnian Sea. The temperatures measured in the city center are slightly higher on average due to the urban heat island effect. Summers are relatively warm. The highest ever recorded temperature in this weather station was 33.3 °C (91.9 °F), on 13 July 2010 and the lowest official temperature ever recorded was -36.8 °C (-34.2 °F), on 3 February 1966. Visiting the famous "Yyteri" beach is arguably the best pastime thing to do in Pori on warm summer days. In fact, it gathers the most visitors out of any other beach in Finland on summers.

Politics
The largest parties in Pori are Social Democratic Party and National Coalition Party. In 2021 municipal elections the parties gained 21.5% and 20.4% of vote, respectively. The mayor of Pori is Aino-Maija Luukkonen, who was elected to run the city in 2004 after the former mayor, Martti Sinisalmi, retired from the post.

Transport 

Pori railway station and bus station are located in the city center. Since the Pori station is a terminal train station, railway traffic is quite moderate. Pori is only connected to Tampere with 13 daily departures by the Tampere–Pori railway. Bus traffic is very busy instead. Pori has more than 100 intercity buses with major Finnish cities Helsinki, Turku and Tampere as well as smaller places like Rauma and Vaasa. Public transport is managed by the city owned bus company Porin Linjat. It has also service to nearby municipalities. The most significant highways from Pori to other cities are Highway 2 to Helsinki, Highway 8 (to south) to Turku and (to north) to Vaasa, Highway 11 to Tampere and Highway 23 to Jyväskylä.

Pori Airport has daily connections to Helsinki Airport and Stockholm Airport. Also seasonal flights to ski resorts of Lapland as well as charter flights to several Mediterranean countries.

Port of Pori is specialized on bulk cargo. It has liner service to several Northern European ports. In October 2013 Pori was the destination of MS Nordic Orion, the first commercial cargo ship ever to transit the Northwest Passage. She was carrying a cargo of coking coal from Port Metro Vancouver, Canada.

Economy

There were 35,216 jobs in 2014. 7,548 residents of other municipalities worked in Pori and 5,710 Pori employees outside the city in 2014. The unemployment rate was 10.7% in May 2018.

The largest employer in Pori in terms of the number of employees in 2016 was the city of Pori with more than 5,000 employees. Other major employers include Technip and Satakunta University of Applied Sciences.

Education 

Pori is the home of 28 comprehensive schools and 7 gymnasiums including English, French and German classes as well as the Swedish-speaking Björnebogs svenska samskola, Rudolf Steiner School and a Christian school. First Trivial school in Pori was founded in 1641. Today it is succeeded by Pori Lyceum established 1879. Vocational education is given in five institutes including the music school Palmgren Conservatory and Finnish Aviation Academy which is owned by the state of Finland and Finnish flag carrier airline Finnair.

Highest grades of education in Pori are the Satakunta University of Applied Sciences and University Consortium of Pori (UCPori).

Culture 
In 1987, the Art Association NYTE, an artist group and art association is founded.

Pori Jazz Festival 

Pori is widely known for its international jazz music festival, established in 1966. Today Pori Jazz is one of the major jazz festivals in Europe as well as one of the largest culture events in Finland. The nine-day festival is held annually in July. Many renowned musicians have played the festival over the years, including artists like B. B. King, Ray Charles, Miles Davis, Keith Jarrett, Bob Dylan, Elton John, Kanye West and  Santana.

Concert arenas are located around the city. Main venue is Kirjurinluoto Arena, which is an open-air concert park holding an audience more than 30,000. The arena has hosted also many other events like Sonisphere Festival in 2009 and 2010. SuomiAreena in an international public debate forum held simultaneously with Pori Jazz.

Theatre and music 

Pori is considered to be the birthplace of Finnish-language theatre as the Finnish National Theatre gave its first performance at Hotel Otava on October 13, 1872. Pori Theatre is a municipal theatre established in 1931 as a merger of two local stages. Theatre building was completed in 1884. Another professional theatre in Pori is Rakastajat-teatteri. It is also hosting an annual festival for independent theatre groups. Pori is a home for several amateur and youth theatres and the Kirjurinluoto Summer Theatre  that presents open-air productions in summertime.

Pori Symphony Orchestra was established 1938 and it is today known as Pori Sinfonietta. The orchestra performs in 1999 built Promenadikeskus music hall. The first city orchestra was founded in 1877. In its early years the orchestra was mostly performing light orchestral music and its musicians were German. The very first symphony concert was played in 1902. Most famous classical composer from Pori is Selim Palmgren, even called as "The Finnish Chopin". Pori Opera was established in 1976. It performs a yearly production together with Pori Sinfonietta and Pori Opera Choir. In 2004 they recorded Kung Karls jakt which is the first opera composed in Finland.

Museums 
Satakunta Museum is a historical museum established 1888. It is one of the oldest historical museums in Finland and presents the history of Satakunta province and the city of Pori. Museum building was completed in 1973. Pori Art Museum is a museum of contemporary and modern art. It was opened in 1979. Museum is based on the collections of local art collector and patronage Maire Gullichsen. Pori Art Museum is located in a former weigh house originally built in 1860. Other museums in Pori are the Rosenlew Museum which is presenting the industrial heritage of Rosenlew Company and the natural history museum Luontotalo Arkki. Toivo is the renovation center of Satakunta Museum. It presents traditional ways of restoring wooden houses with an exhibition of typical early 1900s home.

Sports 

Major team sports in Pori are ice hockey and football. Pori is especially known for its popular hockey team Ässät which is a three-time Finnish Champion, most recently in 2013. Their victory parade gathered some 20,000 people to the Pori market square. Local top football side FC Jazz have won the Finnish premier league Veikkausliiga in 1993 and 1996. The club has also competed in several UEFA competitions. FC Jazz currently plays in the third tier Kakkonen. Top local football team is at the moment Musan Salama which plays in second tier, Ykkönen. Women's football teams are in regional level (Kolmosdivisioona).

Other popular team sports in Pori are bandy and pesäpallo, the Finnish version of baseball. Women's pesäpallo team Pesäkarhut and bandy side Narukerä are both playing in the premier divisions. Pori has also men's and women's lower division teams in almost all major team sports, including clubs like Musan Salama (football), Pori Futsal (futsal), Bears (American football), Pori Rugby (rugby union) and Karhut (floorball). The oldest sportsclub in Finland, Segelföreningen i Björneborg was established 1856 in Pori.

The biggest sports club in Pori is Liikuntaseura Pori, which offers multiple sports including gymnastics, TeamGym and cheerleading.

Olympic gold medal winners from Pori include Greco-Roman wrestler Kelpo Gröndahl (1952) and weightlifter Kaarlo Kangasniemi (1968). Leo-Pekka Tähti, five-time Paralympic gold medalist in category T54 sprint events (100m: 2004, 2008, 2012, 2016; 200m: 2004), is also from Pori. Other Olympic medalists from Pori are swimmer Arvo Aaltonen (1920), weightlifter Jouni Grönman (1984), boxers Joni Nyman (1984) and Jyri Kjäll (1992), pole vaulter Eeles Landström (1960), archer Kyösti Laasonen (1972) and ice hockey players Sakari Salminen (2014) and Sari Marjamäki (née Fisk, 1998). The best known, currently active athletes from Pori are swimmer Matti Mattsson, hurdler Nooralotta Neziri, NHL ice hockey goaltender Joonas Korpisalo and players Jesperi Kotkaniemi, Joel Armia and Erik Haula, and Paralympic gold medalist Leo-Pekka Tähti. Mikko Salo won the 2009 CrossFit Games in Aromas, California and was declared the "World's Fittest Man."

Sporting facilities 
12,300 seated Pori Stadium, which is primarily used for football, is one of the largest multi-purpose stadiums in Finland. It is the home ground for FC Jazz and NiceFutis. The stadium has also been a venue for two Finland internationals. Pori Stadium has hosted the Finnish Championships in Athletics three times and will be the venue of 2015 games.

Stadium is located at the Isomäki sports center. The area includes several other facilities like the Isomäki Areena ice hockey arena for 6,500 spectators, indoor football arena, rink for bandy and skating, tennis courts and outdoor swimming stadium. Pori Racetrack is one of the major horse racing venues in Finland. Speedway track for motorcycles is located in the Yyteri area 20 kilometres out of the city as well as Yyteri Golf. The other golf course, Pori Golf Club, is on the outskirts of city.

The new city owned indoor swimming pool was opened in September 2011. It is a modern facility with seven pools of variable depth and size, three saunas and a gym.

Media 
The most widely read daily newspaper of Pori area is the independent Satakunnan Kansa. Other local media were the politically-affiliated papers Uusi Aika, which was aligned with the Social Democrats, and Satakunnan Työ, which was aligned with the Left Alliance.

Radio Pori is a radio station established in 1985 as one of the first commercial stations in Finland. Eazy 101 was during 2012–2015 a local radio station mainly for younger people under 30. Public service radio in Pori area is Yle Satakunta, a regional station of Yle Radio Suomi. Yle TV2 screens daily local news from the Pori region and Satakunta province on its national channel.

Points of interest 

Yyteri Beach is located 17 kilometres out of the city center. The six-kilometre-long beach is one of the largest in Baltic Sea. Part of the area designated as a unisex nudist beach. Tourist facilities in Yyteri include a hotel/spa, camping/caravan park and a golf course. It is also very popular among windsurfers. Island of Reposaari is located some 10 kilometres further of Yyteri. It is connected with the mainland by highway. Reposaari is a unique village with a townscape of mostly wooden buildings and a population of 1,000 people. The island has a church, marina, hostel, camping site, several restaurants and a fishing port.

Juselius Mausoleum at the Käppärä Cemetery was built in 1901 for the 11-year-old daughter of businessman Fritz Arthur Jusélius. It is the only mausoleum in Finland. The building is decorated with a frescoes by Akseli Gallen-Kallela who is one of Finland's most prominent painters. Kirjurinluoto is an island and park at the delta of river Kokemäenjoki by the city center. On the south side of the river stand the Empire style buildings of the "old town", raised after the 1852 city fire. 1841 built Old Town Hall is one of the few buildings saved from the fire. Central Pori Church and the Greek Orthodox Church of Pori dedicated to John the Theologian are the most notable churches. 10 kilometres outside the city at the municipality of Ulvila are the Medieval St. Olaf's Church and the 18th century ironworks of Leineperi.

Villa Mairea is a design of Finland's most famous architect Alvar Aalto. It is considered one of his most significant works. The villa is widely known all over the world among the ones interested in modern architecture. Villa Mairea is located in Noormarkku, a municipality annexed with Pori in 2010.

The northernmost district of Pori, Ahlainen, is a natural seaside village consisting of wooden houses. The Ahlainen's wooden church, built in 1796, is located in the district and is the oldest surviving church building in Pori. Eteläranta ("South Shore"), located along the Kokemäki River, is a value area of Pori, as the stone house blocks of the riverside landscape were built mostly after the Great Fire of Pori in 1852.

Demographics

There is a Swedish School and a Swedish Culture Club that are aimed at serving the Finland-Swedish minority in the Satakunta region.

Population development 
The significant population increase in 1950 was the result of annexing nearby areas. Population peaked in the mid-1970s, when it was over 80 000. After that the population declined, and in recent years has remained steady at just over 83 000. After the annex of the neighbouring municipality Noormarkku in 2010 and Lavia in 2015 the population rose to the current level.

In 1952 Pori was the fifth largest city in Finland after Helsinki, Turku, Tampere and Lahti.

Notable people

International relations

Twin towns – Sister cities
Pori is twinned with:
 Bremerhaven, Germany, since 1967
 Eger, Hungary, since 1973
 Kołobrzeg, Poland, since 1975
 Mâcon, France, since 1990
 Porsgrunn, Norway, since 1956
 Riga, Latvia, since 1965
 Stralsund, Germany, since 1968
 Sundsvall, Sweden, since 1940
 Sønderborg, Denmark, since 1952

See also
 Björneborgarnas marsch ("March of the Pori Regiment")
 Kokemäki River
 Lavia
 Pori Jazz
 Porilainen
 Tampere
 Turku
 Turku and Pori Province
 Ulvila
 Vaasa

References

External links

City of Pori – Official website

 
Cities and towns in Finland
Populated coastal places in Finland
Grand Duchy of Finland
Port cities and towns in Finland
Port cities and towns of the Baltic Sea
Populated places established in 1558
Seaside resorts in Finland
1558 establishments in Europe